Galboda Falls(ගල්බොඩ ඇල්ල) is a waterfall in Sri Lanka. It is located by Nuwara Eliya District. Galboda is along the railway track of Colombo to Badulla. The environment is cool with much rain.

Since the area is close to Watawala, where the rainfall is high, the waterfall is ever young. Annual rainfall here exceeds 4500 mm [177 inches], 60% of the rain coming from the south-west monsoon. The dry season is January to February.

Derivation of name 
The name of the fall (Galboda) means ‘fall adjoining the stone’. It derives from the large boulder situated at its foot.

Travel information 

The way to Galboda is by train and by road. There are four express trains from Colombo heading to Badulla and trains stop at Galboda Station. A bus operating from Nawalapitiya to Galboda.

Village life 
Galboda is an isolated village located in between Nawalapitiya and Watawala, in the Colombo-Badulla, the upcountry railway. 
Since there is not a well-developed road system yet, the railway is the only source of transportation for the villagers and travellers.

Nature and wildlife 
At certain times of the year, the water cascades in two streams. Growing in the surrounding woodland is a rare species of orchid and the vicinity is home to wildlife. Among them are 12 species of reptile and 4 are only found in Sri Lanka.

Gallery

See also
 List of waterfalls of Sri Lanka

References

External links 
 Galaboda Falls

Landforms of Nuwara Eliya District
Waterfalls in Central Province, Sri Lanka
Tourist attractions in Central Province, Sri Lanka